Edward K. Wolstenholme (born c. 1954, Preston, Lancashire) is an English former football referee who officiated in the Football League and the Premier League. He now lives in Blackburn, Lancashire, and may be remembered as the referee in charge of a football match in 2002 described as the "Battle of Bramall Lane". His other occupation before becoming a professional for PGMOL in 2001 was as an engineering fitter.

Career
Wolstenholme took up refereeing in 1978, when an injury forced him to give up playing non-League football (for Bamber Bridge, known as Walton-le-Dale F.C. at the time). After starting off in Sunday leagues, he then officiated in the West Lancashire Football League, eventually moving up to the North West Counties League, and in season 1992–93 the Football League list, after having gained experience as a League linesman. His first match after being promoted was the 4–2 win by Crewe over Torquay in the old Second Division on 15 August 1992.

At the close of the 1997–98 season, he was selected not only to referee the old First Division play-off semi-final second leg, but the Final itself. The semi-final second leg occurred on 13 May 1998, between Charlton Athletic and Ipswich Town at The Valley, and Charlton progressed by winning this 1–0 for a 2–0 aggregate score. The Final took place at Wembley on 25 May 1998, and Charlton's opponents were Sunderland. The score being 3–3 at the end of 90 minutes, extra time was played, and a further one goal each was converted during that period. This meant that a penalty shoot-out was necessary, and Charlton gained a 7–6 "sudden death" triumph to secure their place in the Premier League for the 1998–99 season.

The end of the 2000–01 season was very busy for Wolstenholme. He was first appointed to oversee the FA Vase Final on 6 May 2001 at Villa Park, Birmingham, played between Berkhamsted Town and Taunton Town, when the Somerset side won 2–1. Then, on 13 May 2001, he took charge of the League Two play-off semi-final first leg between Hull City and Leyton Orient, which finished 1–0.

The following day, he controlled the 4–2 home win by Walsall over Stoke in a League One play-off semi-final second leg, which was also the cumulative score that secured Walsall's progression. Lastly, he was given the honour of refereeing the League One play-off final as well, played at the Millennium Stadium, Cardiff, on 27 May 2001, when Walsall won promotion to the Championship by beating Reading by 3 goals to 2.

He was offered full professional terms by the Professional Game Match Officials Board during the following close season in 2001, and agreed to join the Select Group of referees (officiating in the Premier League), although this would only be for a maximum of two seasons before his retirement due to age restrictions. He took charge of his first ever Premier League match during the fixture involving Ipswich Town and Derby County at Portman Road on 21 August 2001, the home club winning 3–1.

In 2002, Wolstenholme was involved in a match, which did not last the 90 minutes, but which remains in the records. Sheffield United played West Bromwich Albion at their home ground, Bramall Lane, in the old Football League First Division on 16 March 2002. He dismissed three players during the course of the game, all from Sheffield United. First to go was the goalkeeper, Simon Tracey, after 9 minutes for a handball outside the penalty area (an incident totally unrelated to the chaos that would ensue in the second half). Then, after Georges Santos crashed into Albion's Andy Johnson on 65 minutes, he was also sent off. A minute later, Patrick Suffo was dismissed after a head-to-head confrontation with Derek McInnes. When two other players then had to be withdrawn injured after 77 minutes (coincidentally, immediately after West Brom scored their third goal), and with no replacements available, Wolstenholme had to abandon the game due to United having less than 7 players left on the field. Amongst other sanctions taken by the Football Association, Sheffield United were fined £10,000 and their manager Neil Warnock £300. Santos (given a two-match ban) and Suffo (fined £3,000) never played for United again. The score at the time of the abandonment was 0–3, and the result was allowed to stand despite the game not being completed. The match was subsequently popularised with the title "the Battle of Bramall Lane".

In the final minute of the Everton versus Chelsea match at Goodison Park on 7 December 2002, and with the score 3–1 to the away side, he sent off David Unsworth of Everton for "violent conduct" (using his knee) after an incident involving Chelsea's Danish winger, Jesper Grønkjær. After the match was over, Everton manager David Moyes had to be dissuaded from confronting Wolstenholme in his dressing room by five police officers. The referee would only say: "Striking an opponent is a red-card offence and it doesn't matter what you strike him with. Things will have to go through the proper channels now and I'll probably look at it again." Despite this, the red card was eventually confirmed, although Everton did manage to prevent Wolstenholme from being involved during their match against Bolton 21 days later, Matt Messias replacing him as fourth official.

On 12 February 2003, he was fourth official during the 3–1 home defeat for England against Australia in a friendly match at Upton Park, London. This was the most notable appointment throughout his sparse international involvement.

After the 2–0 home win by Millwall over Coventry in the Football League Championship on 5 May 2003, Wolstenholme retired from refereeing, having officiated for only two seasons in the Premiership.

He then took up the role of a referees' assessor. While in that position prior to a Premier League match between Burnley and Newcastle United at Turf Moor in November 2018, Wolstenholme suffered a heart attack. The match was delayed by 30 minutes and he was hospitalised. He was later required to have heart bypass surgery.

Retirement and family life
Wolstenholme carried out the trade of engineering fitter in Preston, Lancashire, before briefly becoming a full-time paid referee from 2001 until his retirement in 2003. He has since become Referees' Officer for the Lancashire County Football Association. He still lives in the Pleckgate area of Blackburn, with his wife, Fiona, and they have two children, a son and a daughter.

References

External links
Eddie Wolstenholme Referee Statistics  at soccerbase.com (from 1997 only)

English football referees
Premier League referees
1954 births
People from Blackburn
Living people
Bamber Bridge F.C. players
Association footballers not categorized by position
English footballers